Poraniopsis is a genus of starfish in the family Poraniidae in the order Valvatida. Poraniopsis echinaster is the type species.

Species
The following species are recognised:
Poraniopsis echinaster Perrier, 1891
Poraniopsis inflata  (Fisher, 1906)

References

Poraniidae
Asteroidea genera
Taxa named by Edmond Perrier